Fox hunting is an activity involving the tracking, chase and, if caught, the killing of a fox.

Fox hunt may refer to:
Foxhunt (EP), a 2005 EP by Dukes of Windsor
Fox Hunt (novel), a novel by James Clancy Phelan
Fox Hunt (video game), a 1996 video game by Capcom
Operation Fox Hunt, a Chinese covert global operation whose stated aim is anti-corruption. 

The Fox Hunt may refer to:
The Fox Hunt (painting), an 1893 oil on canvas painting by Winslow Homer
The Fox Hunt (1931 film), a Silly Symphony short film by Walt Disney
The Fox Hunt (1938 film), a Donald Duck short film by Walt Disney

Fox hunting may refer to:
Fox Hunting (film), a 1980 Russian film
Radio fox hunting, a form of orienteering and radiosport

See also
Fox Hunters' Chase, a National Hunt steeplechase in England 
Bosko's Fox Hunt, a 1931 one-reel short subject featuring Bosko; part of the Looney Tunes series
The Wolf and Fox Hunt, a c.1616 painting by Peter Paul Rubens now held in the Metropolitan Museum of Art in New York
Memoirs of a Fox-Hunting Man, a 1928 novel by Siegfried Sassoon